Hugh Macmillan may refer to:
 Hugh Macmillan, Baron Macmillan (1873–1952), Scottish advocate, judge, parliamentarian and civil servant
 Hugh Macmillan (minister) (1833–1903), Scottish minister of the Free Church of Scotland

See also
 Hugh McMillan (disambiguation)